Topaz is a Cold War suspense novel by Leon Uris, published in 1967 by McGraw-Hill.  The novel spent one week atop The New York Times Best Seller List (on the list dated October 15, 1967), and was Uris's first New York Times number-one bestseller since Exodus in 1959.  During its 52-week run on the list, Topaz set two records in two weeks; those for largest positional jump to number-one (9-1) and largest positional fall from number-one (1-5).

Overview
On the eve of the Cuban Missile Crisis, American and French intelligence agents are plunged into a maze of Cold War intrigue. In Paris, 1962, French intelligence chief André Devereaux and NATO intelligence chief Michael Nordstrom have uncovered Soviet plans to ship nuclear arms to Cuba. But when Devereaux reports his findings and nobody acts—and he is targeted in an assassination attempt—he soon realizes he’s tangled in a plot far greater than he first understood. The two agents, along with a small band of Cuban exiles and Soviet defectors, chase leads around the globe in a quest to save NATO, themselves, and perhaps the world itself.

Film adaptation

In 1969, Universal Pictures released Alfred Hitchcock's Topaz, based on the Uris novel.  It was a critical and commercial failure.

Basis in fact

The events in Topaz are based to a limited degree on the Martel affair, which involved a Soviet defector, Anatoliy Golitsyn, who indicated there were deep KGB penetrations within the French establishment. This was taking place during the Cuban Missile Crisis, and the actions of one French agent in gathering information in Cuba became swept up in the events. The agent became friends with Uris after moving to the US in 1963.

1967 American novels
American novels adapted into films
American thriller novels
Novels by Leon Uris
Novels set during the Cold War